Miloš Milinović (born 12 July 1984) is a Serbian football goalkeeper who last played for Swedish club Västanviks AIF.

References

External links
 
 Miloš Milinović stats at utakmica.rs
 Miloš Milinović stats at footballdatabase.eu

1984 births
Living people
People from Inđija
Association football goalkeepers
Serbian footballers
FK Inđija players
FK Radnički Nova Pazova players
RFK Novi Sad 1921 players
FK ČSK Čelarevo players
FK Borac Banja Luka players
FK Donji Srem players
FK Sloga Petrovac na Mlavi players
Serbian SuperLiga players